Patrick Tay Teck Guan  (born 1 December 1971) is a Singaporean politician and lawyer. A member of the governing People's Action Party (PAP), he has been the Member of Parliament (MP) representing Pioneer SMC since 2020 and previously the Nee Soon East division of Nee Soon GRC between 2011 and 2015, and the Boon Lay division of West Coast GRC between 2015 and 2020. 

A lawyer by profession, Tay has held positions in various trade unions in Singapore since 2002, and has been an assistant secretary-general of the National Trades Union Congress since February 2014.

Education
Tay attended St. Patrick's School and Temasek Junior College. In 1990, he received a Public Service Commission Local Merit Scholarship to read law at the National University of Singapore, from which he graduated with a Bachelor of Laws with honours degree in 1995. 

He subsequently went on to complete a Master of Laws degree at the National University of Singapore in 1999 and an Advanced Management Program at Harvard Business School in 2014.

Career
Tay started his career in the Singapore Police Force and served from 1995 to 2002, during which he was the commanding officer of the Special Tactics and Rescue (STAR) unit. From 2002 to 2014, he held positions in various trade unions, including assistant director of the National Trades Union Congress (2002–2004); executive secretary of the Union of Security Employees (2004–2011); Head IR of the Shipbuilding & Marine Engineering Employees' Union (2004–2009); and executive secretary of the Healthcare Services Employees' Union (2006–2014).

Tay is an assistant secretary-general and director of strategy and legal services at the National Trades Union Congress, as well as executive secretary of the Singapore Manual and Mercantile Workers' Union, and executive secretary of the Banking & Financial Services Union. He also holds the positions of board member, trustee, adviser, committee member, etc. at many organisations, including various trade unions, Economic Development Board, Inland Revenue Authority of Singapore, Public Utilities Board and Housing and Development Board.

An advocate and solicitor of the Supreme Court, Tay is also an associate mediator of the Singapore Mediation Centre and a fellow of the Singapore Institute of Arbitrators.

Political career
Tay entered politics in the 2011 general election when he joined a five-member People's Action Party (PAP) team contesting in Nee Soon GRC. After the PAP team won with 58.4% of the vote against the Workers' Party, Tay became an elected Member of Parliament representing the Nee Soon East ward of Nee Soon GRC. In 2014, Tay raised the concerns of PMEs and how the Budget could support them in terms of protection, progression, placement and privileges. In the 2016 debate on the President's address, Tay called for a PME dependency ratio (akin to those for S Passes and Work Permits) to be implemented for companies which have a weak Singaporean core and a weak commitment to creating a Singaporean core.

During the 2015 general election, Tay switched to join the four-member PAP team contesting in West Coast GRC and they won with 78.57% of the vote against the Reform Party. Tay thus became a Member of Parliament for a second term, representing the Boon Lay ward of West Coast GRC.

In the 2020 general election, Tay contested as a solo PAP candidate in Pioneer SMC and won with 61.98% of the vote against the Progress Singapore Party candidate Lim Cher Hong and independent candidate Cheang Peng Wah. Starting 11 July 2020, he became the Member of Parliament representing Pioneer SMC in the 14th Parliament.

Throughout his first two terms in Parliament, Tay had been a member of the Government Parliamentary Committees (GPCs) for Manpower and Health (2011–2015), and Home Affairs and Law (2015–2020). He was also the chairman of the GPC for Manpower from 2015 to 2020.

Awards
Tay received the Good Service Medal from the Singapore Police Force in 2000 and the Public Service Medal in 2005. He also received the PAP Youth Service Medal and the 15 Years Community Long Service Award from the People's Association in 2007, and the Public Service Star in 2010.

See also
 14th Parliament of Singapore

References

External links
 Patrick Tay on Parliament of Singapore

1971 births
Living people
Recipients of the Bintang Bakti Masyarakat
Singaporean Christians
Singaporean people of Teochew descent
Members of the Parliament of Singapore